The Snows of Kilimanjaro is a 1952 American Technicolor romantic adventure film directed by Henry King from a screenplay by Casey Robinson, based on the 1936 short story of the same name by Ernest Hemingway. It stars Gregory Peck as Harry Street, Susan Hayward as Helen, and Ava Gardner as Cynthia Green (a character invented for the film). The film's ending does not mirror that of the short story.

Considered by Hemingway to be one of his finest stories, "The Snows of Kilimanjaro" was first published in Esquire magazine in 1936 and then republished in The Fifth Column and the First Forty-Nine Stories (1938).

The Snows of Kilimanjaro was a critical and commercial success upon its release and became the third highest-grossing film of 1952. It was nominated for two Oscars at the 25th Academy Awards, for Best Cinematography, Color and Best Art Direction, Color (Lyle R. Wheeler, John DeCuir, Thomas Little, Paul S. Fox).

The film has entered the public domain.

Plot

The film begins with the opening words of Hemingway's story: "Kilimanjaro is a snow-covered mountain 19,710 feet high, and is said to be the highest mountain in Africa. Its western summit is called the Masai 'Ngje Ngi,' the House of God. Close to the western summit there is the dried and frozen carcass of a leopard. No one has explained what the leopard was seeking at that altitude."

The story centers on the memories of disillusioned writer, Harry Street, who is on safari in Africa. He has a severely infected wound from a thorn prick, and lies outside his tent awaiting a slow death, though in the film it is pointed out he may have acquired the infection from leaping into a muddy river to rescue one of the safari's porters from a hippo after he falls in the river. His female companion, Helen, nurses Harry and hunts game for the larder.

The loss of mobility brings self-reflection. In an often delirious state he remembers his past relationship with Cynthia Green, whom he met in Paris as members of the "Lost Generation."  Upon the sale of Harry's first novel, rather than rent a nicer home, Harry wishes to go on safari to Africa. There he has his happiest moments, including bagging a rhino. Cynthia is pregnant, but worries about sharing this news with Harry, who is passionate about his travels and work as a journalist and author. Harry only learns about the pregnancy after her miscarriage.  Suffering depression and sinking into alcoholism, she eventually leaves Harry for a flamenco dancer when she believes Harry is off for a job as a war correspondent.

Harry later becomes engaged to the wealthy and socially connected Countess Elizabeth, whom he meets on the Cote d'Azur; however, he still remains loyal to the memory of Cynthia.  On the eve of their wedding, a jealous Elizabeth confronts Harry with a letter to Harry sent from Cynthia, who is  now in Madrid. Elizabeth destroys the letter in front of Harry who stalks off to go to Spain. Unable to find Cynthia at the Madrid address on the envelope, he enlists to fight in the Spanish Civil War. During a battle he meets Cynthia, who is now an ambulance driver. Cynthia is mortally wounded, and Harry is shot and wounded when he deserts the battle to try to bring the dying Cynthia to a doctor.

Harry returns to Paris. While he is standing on a bridge watching the River Seine, he meets Helen, who reminds him of Cynthia. After the death of his beloved mentor Uncle Bill, Harry receives as a bequest a letter from his uncle that gives him the riddle of the leopard. Harry's bartender suggests that the leopard ended up there as he was on a false scent and became lost, but Harry takes Helen on a safari to Kenya to learn the answer of the riddle. He is injured and develops an infection. As Harry nears death, the protective Helen fights off a witch doctor.  Following the directions in an emergency first aid manual, she opens Harry's wound to release the infection. At the dawn a medical party arrives by airplane. The vultures and hyena who have been awaiting Harry's death leave and never return. Harry realizes his love for Helen.

Cast

 Gregory Peck as Harry Street
 Charles Bates as Harry Street (17 years)
 Susan Hayward as Helen
 Ava Gardner as Cynthia Green
 Hildegard Knef as Countess Elizabeth
 Emmett Smith as Molo
 Leo G. Carroll as Uncle Bill
 Torin Thatcher as Mr. Johnson
 Marcel Dalio as Emile
 Leonard Carey as Dr. Simmons
 Paul Thompson as Witch Doctor
 Ava Norring as Beatrice
 Helene Stanley as Connie
 Vicente Gómez as Guitarist (as Vicente Gomez)
 Richard Allan as Spanish dancer
 Lisa Ferraday as vendeuse

Production 

Twentieth Century-Fox bought the rights to the story in June 1948, paying $125,000.

Casting
Humphrey Bogart, Richard Conte and Marlon Brando were all reported to be under consideration for the male lead, as was Dale Robertson.

Filming
The film was shot on location in Nairobi, Kenya, Cairo, Egypt, and the French Riviera, and studio work was done at Stage 14 in 20th Century Fox Studios. During production, on April 8, 1952, when Peck was carrying Gardner for a scene in the film, Peck wrenched his knee and production had to be postponed for 10 days while he recovered in his Pacific Palisades home, and Hildegard Knef came down with influenza in the studios. She was able though to sing two Cole Porter tunes in the film. Jazz musician Benny Carter performs early on in the film.

The bullfight sequences were archive footage, taken from Fox's 1941 film Blood and Sand. Circus animal trainer Pat Anthony replaced Gregory Peck as his stand-in for the hyena attack scene.

Reception

Helped by a star-studded cast, the film was one of the most successful films of the early 1950s and earned $12.5 million at the box office, very high for that period. The film was much acclaimed by critics, although some vary in their opinion of it, ranging from "simply plodding" to "much-maligned". The cinematography was highly acclaimed in particular, and even the sophisticated interiors were praised. Bosley Crowther of The New York Times described the cinematography as "magnificent and exciting" and said that the "overall production in wonderful color is full of brilliant detail and surprise and the mood of nostalgia and wistful sadness that is built up in the story has its spell." He praised Peck's character for his "burning temper and melancholy moods", although he said that Ava Gardner was "pliant and impulsive" in a role "as soggy and ambiguous as any in the film". Variety praised the film as "an often engrossing dramatic mixture of high adventure, romance and symbolism," adding that "the color coating used to display the story's varied locales is beautiful," and "Miss Gardner has never been better." Harrison's Reports called it "at once absorbing, exciting, and fascinating." The Monthly Film Bulletin, however, wrote that Hemingway's dialogue sounded "stilted and a little dated" on the screen, and that "any real seriousness that the film might have retained is nullified by the ending. Letting Harry survive makes of the film a naive kind of spiritual success story with a conventional boy-meets-lots-of-girls plot." Variety commented "the script broadens the short story considerably without losing the Hemingway penchant for the mysticism behind his virile characters and lusty situations.

Craig Butler of AllMovie opines, "The Snows of Kilimanjaro has not aged well over the years...The screenplay (is) in a bit of a no man's land, not really Hemingway, but not quite the real world either. Visually, however, Kilimanjaro is a feast, with the camera capturing the full beauty of its often-stunning locations and also finding emotion in the 'character' scenes. The art direction is lovely...Gardner and Peck create the appropriate romantic chemistry...the direction is uneven...there's still enough here to engage most fans of romance movies."

A more recent appraisal in Bowker's Directory described it as having "plenty of action & romance" and stated that it was "the popular 'celebrity film' of its time". Hemingway, who disliked the typical Hollywood happy ending, accepted the money for the film, but he could not bring himself to view it, according to one report.  However, in a 1954 article for Look magazine, Hemingway said a hyena (voiced by Director King from behind the camera) was the best performer in the picture, which the writer called The Snows of Zanuck.

The film was nominated for two Academy Awards; for Best Cinematography and Best Art Direction (Lyle R. Wheeler, John DeCuir, Thomas Little, Paul S. Fox).

Home media
20th Century Fox released the film on DVD in March 2007, separately and as part of five-disc collection entitled "The  Ernest Hemingway Film Collection", where it was packaged with Under My Skin, The Sun Also Rises, A Farewell to Arms, and Hemingway's Adventures of a Young Man.

References

External links

 
 
 
 
 
 
 

1952 films
1952 romantic drama films
1950s adventure drama films
1950s American films
1950s English-language films
20th Century Fox films
American adventure drama films
American romantic drama films
Films about writers
Films based on short fiction
Films based on works by Ernest Hemingway
Films directed by Henry King
Films produced by Darryl F. Zanuck
Films scored by Bernard Herrmann
Films set in Africa
Films set in Kenya
Films set in Paris
Films set in Spain
Films shot in Egypt
Films shot in Kenya
Films shot in Paris
Spanish Civil War films
Articles containing video clips